Two ships of the Royal Fleet Auxiliary have borne the name RFA Turmoil:

  was a harbour tanker launched in 1917 and sold in 1935
  was a  launched in 1945 as HMS Turmoil. She was chartered out into civilian service in 1946 and became a RFA in 1957. She was sold in 1965 into civilian service

Royal Fleet Auxiliary ship names